NA-255 Sohbat Pur-cum-Jaffarabad-cum Usta Muhammad  is a newly created constituency for the National Assembly of Pakistan. This Constituency formerly known as NA-261 was compromised in Naseerabad and Jaffrabad districts, In the 2018 Elections, Naseerabad was clinched out from it and now comprises the districts of Jafarabad, Sohbatpur, and Usta Muhammad from the province of Balochistan.

Assembly Segments

Members of Parliament

Since 2018: NA-261 Jafarabad-cum-Sohbatpur

Election 2018 

General elections are scheduled to be held on 25 July 2018.

See also
NA-254 Nasirabad-cum-Kachhi-cum-Jhal Magsi
NA-256 Khuzdar

References 

National Assembly Constituencies of Pakistan